Sir John Edward Rowles  (born 26 March 1947) is a New Zealand singer. He was most popular in the late 1960s, 1970s and early 1980s, and he is best known in New Zealand for his song from 1970, "Cheryl Moana Marie", which he wrote about his younger sister.

Early years

Rowles was born in Whakatane, New Zealand, and is part Māori. His father, Eddie Hohapata Rowles, played for the 1938 Māori All Blacks. His mother was European. He was brought up in Kawerau in the Bay of Plenty of New Zealand, and spent much of his early childhood in Te Atatū South in West Auckland. Rowles' birth name was simply John Rowles; he added the middle name "Edward" after his brother of that name died at a young age.

Career
Rowles is best known in New Zealand and Australia, though he has also performed in the United States, particularly Las Vegas, Nevada and Hawaii, where he was managed by Kimo Wilder McVay. In the United Kingdom he was best known for the hit, "If I Only Had Time", which reached number 3 in the UK Singles Chart in spring 1968, and stayed in the chart for eighteen weeks. This was a cover version of the French song "Je n'aurai pas le temps" with which the French singer Michel Fugain had a hit in 1967; he co-wrote the song with Pierre Delanoë. The song also charted in the Netherlands, reaching number 2, after which the Franck Pourcel Orchestra had a minor hit with an instrumental version of the song, bearing the original French song title. In Germany, Schlager singer Peter Rubin charted with the German translation "Hätt ich nur einmal mehr Zeit". In the USA, Nick DeCaro and his orchestra charted with his instrumental version, released as the B-side of the single "Caroline, No" in late 1968, peaking at number 71 in the Cash Box Top 100 in early 1969.

Rowles had another Top 20 hit in the UK with "Hush . . . Not a Word to Mary", also in 1968. This song also charted in the Netherlands.

In the US, "Cheryl Moana Marie" got noticed in the summer of 1970 by some West Coast radio stations, but it took until the end of 1970 for the song to chart nationally, peaking at number 64 in the Billboard Hot 100 and number 78 in the Cash Box Top 100 respectively, in early 1971.

He was the feature of a 2008 documentary entitled The Secret Life of John Rowles.

Rowles had a cameo role in the 2008 New Zealand film, Second Hand Wedding.

He appeared in the 2009 New Zealand version of Dancing With the Stars.  He was partnered with Krystal Stewart. Under doctor's orders, he had to retire from the competition but has since recovered.

Honours and awards
In 1974, Rowles received the Benny Award from the Variety Artists Club of New Zealand Inc, the highest honour available to a New Zealand variety entertainer.

Rowles was appointed an Officer of the Order of the British Empire in the 1979 New Year Honours, for services to entertainment and New Zealand interests in the United States. He was appointed a Knight Companion of the New Zealand Order of Merit, for services to entertainment, in the 2018 Queen's Birthday Honours.

Awards

Aotearoa Music Awards
The Aotearoa Music Awards (previously known as New Zealand Music Awards (NZMA)) are an annual awards night celebrating excellence in New Zealand music and have been presented annually since 1965.

! 
|-
| 1978 || John Rowles || Male Artist of the Year ||  || 
|-

Family 
His older brother Wally Rowles was a solo singer with his own career, and for a while went under the name of Frankie Price. He later changed his name again to Frankie Rowles due to an artist "Price" who was working in Australia. Under Frankie Price he recorded three singles "Pancho Lopez" b/w "Walk Like A Man, "Another Tear Falls" b/w "I Could Have Loved You So Well" and "Sweet Mary" b/w "Take A Little Time". All of which were released on the Polydor label. Under the name Frankie Rowles, he recorded a single "Ma Vie C'est Toi" b/w "Live A Little Longer" which was released on the Gemini label. He died at age 59 on 24 March 2004.

His sister Tania Rowles was a recording artist and had the single "Don't Turn Around" which was released on the RCA label in 1986. She was the New Zealand Music Award for Breakthrough Artist of the Year winner in 1986.

Autobiography 
Rowles released his autobiography, If I Only Had Time, in October 2012.

Discography

References

External links

Official site
AudioCulture profile
New Zealand Music of the '60s and '70s
A New Zealand Herald article on Rowles: October 2006
Promoter of John Rowles concerts worldwide
Documentary The Secret Life of John Rowles, NZOnScreen

1947 births
APRA Award winners
Living people
New Zealand pop singers
New Zealand Māori male singers
New Zealand songwriters
Male songwriters
New Zealand Officers of the Order of the British Empire
Knights Companion of the New Zealand Order of Merit
People from Whakatāne
Singers awarded knighthoods
20th-century New Zealand male singers